Fenomeno is the ninth studio album by the Italian rapper Fabri Fibra. It was released on 7 April 2017 by Universal Music Group.

Track listing

Personnel
Performers
 Fabri Fibra
 Thegiornalisti – track 6
 Roberto Saviano – track 8
 Laïoung – track 12
Producers
 Neff-U – track 2
 Takagi & Ketra – track 3
 Big Fish – tracks 4 and 10
 Alessandro Erba – track 4
 Amadeus – track 7
 Bassi Maestro – tracks 5 and 8
 Mace – track 6
 Demacio "Demo" Castellon, Mike Turco – track 9
 Rhade – track 10
 Shablo – track 11
 Nebbia – track 12
 Deleterio – track 13
 2nd Roof – track 14
 Don Joe, Yung Snapp – track 15
 Rey Reel – track 16
 Bot – track 17

Charts

Weekly charts

Year-end charts

References

2017 albums
Fabri Fibra albums